Akhula may refer to:
 Akhula, Armenia
 Akhula, Iran